Yili (Wade-Giles: "I-li") may refer to:

Etiquette and Rites, pinyin Yílǐ, one of the Confucian classics of Chinese literature
Yili Group, a Chinese dairy company
Ili Kazakh Autonomous Prefecture, in northernmost Xinjiang, China
Yili horse, a pony named for the region